The canton of Metzervisse is an administrative division of the Moselle department, northeastern France. Its borders were not modified at the French canton reorganisation which came into effect in March 2015. Its seat is in Metzervisse.

It consists of the following communes:
 
Aboncourt
Basse-Ham
Bertrange
Bettelainville
Bousse
Buding
Budling
Distroff
Elzange
Guénange
Hombourg-Budange
Inglange
Kédange-sur-Canner
Kemplich
Klang
Kœnigsmacker
Kuntzig
Luttange
Metzeresche
Metzervisse
Monneren
Oudrenne
Rurange-lès-Thionville
Stuckange
Valmestroff
Veckring
Volstroff

References

Cantons of Moselle (department)